The Sky Is Mine is a studio album by Alpha. It was released in the United Kingdom and Europe on 18 September 2007 and released in the United States on 19 February 2008. Founding member Andy Jenks left shortly after the sessions for the album began, leaving other founding member and producer Corin Dingley, joined by long-time Alpha vocalist Wendy Stubbs and keyboardist Peter Wild, to complete the album.

Track listing

References

External links
 

2007 albums
Alpha (band) albums